The Arboretum du Planel is an arboretum and nature preserve located near the Château d'Arques in Arques, Aude, Languedoc-Roussillon, France. It is open daily without charge.

The arboretum was established in 1933 as a nursery for Eaux et Forêts, and is today a nature preserve with good hiking trails. It contains mature specimens of American red oak, Atlas Cedar, Ginkgo biloba, Liriodendron tulipifera, Sequoiadendron, and other plants.

See also 
 List of botanical gardens in France

References 
 Arboretum du Planel
 Fédération Française de la Randonnée Pédestre entry (French)

Planel, Arboretum du
Planel, Arboretum du